The Shadow Cabinet appointed by Conservative Party leader William Hague was the Official Opposition Shadow Cabinet from 1997 to 2001. Following his initial appointments in June 1997, Hague reshuffled the Shadow Cabinet five times before his resignation as leader following defeat in the 2001 general election.

Initial Shadow Cabinet
Rt Hon. William Hague MP — Leader of Her Majesty's Loyal Opposition and Leader of the Conservative Party
Rt Hon. Peter Lilley MP — Shadow Chancellor of the Exchequer
Rt Hon. Michael Howard QC MP — Shadow Secretary of State for Foreign and Commonwealth Affairs
Rt Hon. Sir Brian Mawhinney MP — Shadow Secretary of State for the Home Department
Rt Hon. Cecil Parkinson, Lord Parkinson PC — Chairman of the Conservative Party
Rt Hon. Stephen Dorrell MP — Shadow Secretary of State for Education and Employment
Rt Hon. Gillian Shephard MP — Shadow Leader of the House of Commons and Shadow Chancellor of the Duchy of Lancaster
Rt Hon. Viscount Cranborne PC — Leader of the Opposition in the House of Lords
Rt Hon. Sir George Young Bt MP — Shadow Secretary of State for Defence
Rt Hon. John Redwood MP — Shadow Secretary of State for Trade and Industry
Rt Hon. Sir Norman Fowler MP — Shadow Secretary of State for the Environment, Transport and the Regions
Rt Hon. Michael Ancram QC MP — Constitutional Affairs spokesperson, including Scotland and Wales
Rt Hon. David Curry MP — Shadow Minister of Agriculture, Fisheries and Food
Rt Hon. Alastair Goodlad MP — Shadow Secretary of State for International Development
Rt Hon. David Heathcoat-Amory MP — Shadow Chief Secretary to the Treasury
Rt Hon. Francis Maude MP — Shadow Secretary of State for Culture, Media and Sport
Rt Hon. Andrew Mackay MP — Shadow Secretary of State for Northern Ireland
John Maples MP — Shadow Secretary of State for Health
Rt Hon. Iain Duncan Smith MP — Shadow Secretary of State for Social Security
Rt Hon. James Arbuthnot MP — Opposition Chief Whip
Rt Hon. Thomas Galbraith, Lord Strathclyde PC — Opposition Chief Whip in the House of Lords

June 1998 reshuffle
Hague first reshuffled the Shadow Cabinet on 1 June 1998.
Rt Hon. William Hague MP — Leader of Her Majesty's Loyal Opposition and Leader of the Conservative Party
Rt Hon. Peter Lilley MP — Deputy Leader of the Conservative Party
Rt Hon. Francis Maude MP — Shadow Chancellor of the Exchequer
Rt Hon. Michael Howard QC MP — Shadow Secretary of State for Foreign and Commonwealth Affairs
Rt Hon. Sir Norman Fowler MP — Shadow Secretary of State for the Home Department
Rt Hon. Cecil Parkinson, Lord Parkinson PC — Chairman of the Conservative Party
Rt Hon. Michael Ancram MP — Vice-Chairman of the Conservative Party
David Willetts MP — Shadow Secretary of State for Education and Employment
Rt Hon. Sir George Young Bt MP — Shadow Leader of the House of Commons and Shadow Chancellor of the Duchy of Lancaster
Rt Hon. Viscount Cranborne PC — Leader of the Opposition in the House of Lords
John Maples MP — Shadow Secretary of State for Defence
Rt Hon. John Redwood MP — Shadow Secretary of State for Trade and Industry
Rt Hon. Gillian Shephard MP — Shadow Secretary of State for the Environment, Transport and the Regions
Dr Liam Fox MP — Constitutional Affairs spokesperson
Tim Yeo MP — Shadow Minister of Agriculture, Fisheries and Food
Gary Streeter MP — Shadow Secretary of State for International Development
Rt Hon. David Heathcoat-Amory MP — Shadow Chief Secretary to the Treasury
Peter Ainsworth MP — Shadow Secretary of State for Culture, Media and Sport
Rt Hon. Andrew Mackay MP — Shadow Secretary of State for Northern Ireland
Rt Hon. Ann Widdecombe MP — Shadow Secretary of State for Health
Rt Hon. Iain Duncan Smith MP — Shadow Secretary of State for Social Security
Rt Hon. James Arbuthnot MP — Opposition Chief Whip
Rt Hon. Thomas Galbraith, Lord Strathclyde PC — Opposition Chief Whip in the House of Lords

Junior Shadow Ministers
Rt Hon. Sir Nicholas Lyell MP — Shadow Attorney General
Rt Hon Christopher Prout, Lord Kingsland QC — Shadow Lord Chancellor

Changes from June 1997
Peter Lilley moves from Shadow Chancellor of the Exchequer to Deputy Leader of the Conservative Party
Francis Maude moves from Shadow Secretary of State for Culture, Media and Sport to Shadow Chancellor of the Exchequer
Sir Brian Mawhinney leaves the Shadow Cabinet
Sir Norman Fowler moves from Shadow Secretary of State for the Environment, Transport and the Regions to Shadow Secretary of State for the Home Department
Gillian Shephard moves from Shadow Leader of the House of Commons to Shadow Secretary of State for the Environment, Transport and the Regions
Sir George Young moves from Shadow Secretary of State for Defence to Shadow Leader of the House of Commons
John Maples moves from Shadow Secretary of State for Health to Shadow Secretary of State for Defence
Ann Widdecombe enters the Shadow Cabinet as Shadow Secretary of State for Health
Alastair Goodlad leaves the Shadow Cabinet
Peter Ainsworth enters the Shadow Cabinet as Shadow Secretary of State for Culture, Media and Sport
Liam Fox enters the Shadow Cabinet as Constitutional Affairs spokesperson
Gary Streeter enters the Shadow Cabinet as Shadow Secretary of State for International Development
David Curry leaves the Shadow Cabinet
Tim Yeo enters the Shadow Cabinet as Shadow Minister of Agriculture, Fisheries and Food
Michael Ancram becomes Vice-Chairman of the Conservative Party. A few months later he succeeded Parkinson with his own successor not sitting in the Shadow Cabinet.

December 1998
A minor Shadow Cabinet reshuffle was required on 2 December 1998, due to the sacking of Viscount Cranborne over the House of Lords Act 1999. Cranborne had been engaged in secret negotiations with the Labour Government over the issue of hereditary peers, without informing William Hague. This amendment (proposed by Bernard Weatherill for issues of formality, known as the Weatherill Amendment) allowed 92 hereditary peers to remain. The sacking of Cranborne led to a leadership crisis, with some Conservative peers resigning the party whip.

Shadow Cabinet
Rt Hon. William Hague MP — Leader of Her Majesty's Loyal Opposition and Leader of the Conservative Party
Rt Hon. Peter Lilley MP — Deputy Leader of the Conservative Party
Rt Hon. Francis Maude MP — Shadow Chancellor of the Exchequer
Rt Hon. Michael Howard QC MP — Shadow Secretary of State for Foreign and Commonwealth Affairs
Rt Hon. Sir Norman Fowler MP — Shadow Secretary of State for the Home Department
Michael Ancram MP — Chairman of the Conservative Party
David Willetts MP — Shadow Secretary of State for Education and Employment
Rt Hon. Sir George Young Bt MP — Shadow Leader of the House of Commons and Shadow Chancellor of the Duchy of Lancaster
Rt Hon. Thomas Galbraith, Lord Strathclyde PC — Leader of the Opposition in the House of Lords
John Maples MP — Shadow Secretary of State for Defence
Rt Hon. John Redwood MP — Shadow Secretary of State for Trade and Industry
Rt Hon. Gillian Shephard MP — Shadow Secretary of State for the Environment, Transport and the Regions
Dr Liam Fox MP — Constitutional Affairs spokesperson
Tim Yeo MP — Shadow Minister of Agriculture, Fisheries and Food
Gary Streeter MP — Shadow Secretary of State for International Development
Rt Hon. David Heathcoat-Amory MP — Shadow Chief Secretary to the Treasury
Peter Ainsworth MP — Shadow Secretary of State for Culture, Media and Sport
Rt Hon. Andrew Mackay MP — Shadow Secretary of State for Northern Ireland
Rt Hon. Ann Widdecombe MP — Shadow Secretary of State for Health
Rt Hon. Iain Duncan Smith MP — Shadow Secretary of State for Social Security
Rt Hon. James Arbuthnot MP — Opposition Chief Whip
Oliver Eden, Lord Henley — Opposition Chief Whip in the House of Lords

Changes
Rt Hon. Viscount Cranborne PC is sacked from the Shadow Cabinet
Rt Hon. Thomas Galbraith, Lord Strathclyde PC moves from Opposition Chief Whip in the House of Lords to Leader of the Opposition in the House of Lords
Oliver Eden, Lord Henley enters the Shadow Cabinet as Opposition Chief Whip in the House of Lords

1999 reshuffle
Hague again reshuffled the Shadow Cabinet on 15 June 1999.
Rt Hon. William Hague MP — Leader of Her Majesty's Loyal Opposition and Leader of the Conservative Party
Rt Hon. Francis Maude MP — Shadow Chancellor of the Exchequer
Rt Hon. John Maples MP — Shadow Secretary of State for Foreign and Commonwealth Affairs
Rt Hon. Ann Widdecombe MP — Shadow Secretary of State for the Home Department
Rt Hon. Michael Ancram QC MP — Chairman of the Conservative Party
Rt Hon. Theresa May MP — Shadow Secretary of State for Education and Employment
Rt Hon. Sir George Young Bt MP — Shadow Leader of the House of Commons, Shadow Chancellor of the Duchy of Lancaster and Constitutional Affairs spokesperson
Rt Hon. Thomas Galbraith, Lord Strathclyde PC — Leader of the Opposition in the House of Lords
Rt Hon. Iain Duncan Smith MP — Shadow Secretary of State for Defence
Angela Browning MP — Shadow Secretary of State for Trade and Industry
Rt Hon. John Redwood MP — Shadow Secretary of State for the Environment, Transport and the Regions
Tim Yeo MP — Shadow Minister of Agriculture, Fisheries and Food
Gary Streeter MP — Shadow Secretary of State for International Development
Rt Hon. David Heathcoat-Amory MP — Shadow Chief Secretary to the Treasury
Peter Ainsworth MP — Shadow Secretary of State for Culture, Media and Sport
Rt Hon. Andrew Mackay MP — Shadow Secretary of State for Northern Ireland
Dr Liam Fox MP — Shadow Secretary of State for Health
David Willetts MP — Shadow Secretary of State for Social Security
Rt Hon. James Arbuthnot MP — Opposition Chief Whip
Oliver Eden, Lord Henley — Opposition Chief Whip in the House of Lords

Junior Shadow Ministers
Edward Garnier QC MP — Shadow Attorney General
Rt Hon Christopher Prout, Lord Kingsland QC — Shadow Lord Chancellor
Bernard Jenkin MP — Shadow Minister for Transport
Andrew Lansley MP — Shadow Cabinet Office Minister

Changes from 2 December 1998
Peter Lilley leaves the Shadow Cabinet
Cecil Lord Parkinson leaves the Shadow Cabinet
Michael Howard leaves the Shadow Cabinet
Gillian Shephard leaves the Shadow Cabinet
Sir Norman Fowler leaves the Shadow Cabinet
Sir Nicholas Lyell leaves the Shadow Ministerial Team
Theresa May enters the Shadow Cabinet as Shadow Secretary of State for Education and Employment
Angela Browning enters the Shadow Cabinet as Shadow Secretary of State for Trade and Industry
Edward Garnier enters the Shadow Ministerial Team as Shadow Attorney General
Bernard Jenkin enters the Shadow Ministerial Team as Shadow Transport Minister
Andrew Lansley enters the Shadow Ministerial Team as Shadow Cabinet Office Minister
Ann Widdecombe moves from Shadow Secretary of State for Health to Shadow Secretary of State for the Home Department
John Maples moves from Shadow Secretary of State for Defence to Shadow Secretary of State for Foreign and Commonwealth Affairs
John Redwood moves from Shadow Secretary of State for Trade and Industry to Shadow Secretary of State for the Environment, Transport and the Regions
Liam Fox moves from Constitutional Affairs spokesperson to Shadow Secretary of State for Health
Iain Duncan Smith moves from Shadow Secretary of State for Social Security to Shadow Secretary of State for Defence
David Willetts moves from Shadow Secretary of State for Education and Employment to Shadow Secretary of State for Social Security

February 2000 reshuffle
On 2 February 2000, Hague again reshuffled the Shadow Cabinet.
Rt Hon. William Hague MP — Leader of Her Majesty's Loyal Opposition and Leader of the Conservative Party
Rt Hon. Michael Portillo MP — Shadow Chancellor of the Exchequer
Rt Hon. Francis Maude MP — Shadow Secretary of State for Foreign and Commonwealth Affairs
Rt Hon. Ann Widdecombe MP — Shadow Secretary of State for the Home Department
Rt Hon. Michael Ancram QC MP — Chairman of the Conservative Party
Rt Hon. Theresa May MP — Shadow Secretary of State for Education and Employment
Rt Hon. Sir George Young Bt MP — Shadow Leader of the House of Commons, Shadow Chancellor of the Duchy of Lancaster and Constitutional Affairs spokesperson
Rt Hon. Thomas Galbraith, Lord Strathclyde PC — Leader of the Opposition in the House of Lords
Rt Hon. Iain Duncan Smith MP — Shadow Secretary of State for Defence
Angela Browning MP — Shadow Secretary of State for Trade and Industry
Archie Norman MP — Shadow Secretary of State for the Environment, Transport and the Regions
Tim Yeo MP — Shadow Minister of Agriculture, Fisheries and Food
Gary Streeter MP — Shadow Secretary of State for International Development
Rt Hon. David Heathcoat-Amory MP — Shadow Chief Secretary to the Treasury
Peter Ainsworth MP — Shadow Secretary of State for Culture, Media and Sport
Rt Hon. Andrew Mackay MP — Shadow Secretary of State for Northern Ireland
Dr Liam Fox MP — Shadow Secretary of State for Health
David Willetts MP — Shadow Secretary of State for Social Security
Rt Hon. James Arbuthnot MP — Opposition Chief Whip
Oliver Eden, Lord Henley — Opposition Chief Whip in the House of Lords

Junior Shadow Ministers
Edward Garnier QC MP — Shadow Attorney General
Rt Hon Christopher Prout, Lord Kingsland QC — Shadow Lord Chancellor
Bernard Jenkin MP — Shadow Minister for Transport
Andrew Lansley CBE MP — Shadow Cabinet Office Minister

Changes from 15 June 1999
John Redwood leaves the Shadow Cabinet
John Maples leaves the Shadow Cabinet
Michael Portillo enters the Shadow Cabinet as Shadow Chancellor of the Exchequer
Archie Norman enters the Shadow Cabinet as Shadow Secretary of State for the Environment, Transport and the Regions
Francis Maude moves from Shadow Chancellor of the Exchequer to Shadow Secretary of State for Foreign and Commonwealth Affairs

September 2000 reshuffle
Hague's final Shadow Cabinet reshuffle occurred on 26 September 2000.
Rt Hon. William Hague MP — Leader of Her Majesty's Loyal Opposition and Leader of the Conservative Party
Rt Hon. Michael Portillo MP — Shadow Chancellor of the Exchequer
Rt Hon. Francis Maude MP — Shadow Secretary of State for Foreign and Commonwealth Affairs
Rt Hon. Ann Widdecombe MP — Shadow Secretary of State for the Home Department
Rt Hon. Michael Ancram QC MP — Chairman of the Conservative Party
Rt Hon. Theresa May MP — Shadow Secretary of State for Education and Employment
Angela Browning MP — Shadow Leader of the House of Commons, Shadow Chancellor of the Duchy of Lancaster and Constitutional Affairs spokesperson
Rt Hon. Thomas Galbraith, Lord Strathclyde PC — Leader of the Opposition in the House of Lords
Rt Hon. Iain Duncan Smith MP — Shadow Secretary of State for Defence
Rt Hon. David Heathcoat-Amory MP — Shadow Secretary of State for Trade and Industry
Archie Norman MP — Shadow Secretary of State for the Environment, Transport and the Regions
Tim Yeo MP — Shadow Minister of Agriculture, Fisheries and Food
Gary Streeter MP — Shadow Secretary of State for International Development
Rt Hon. Oliver Letwin MP — Shadow Chief Secretary to the Treasury
Peter Ainsworth MP — Shadow Secretary of State for Culture, Media and Sport
Rt Hon. Andrew Mackay MP — Shadow Secretary of State for Northern Ireland
Dr Liam Fox MP — Shadow Secretary of State for Health
David Willetts MP — Shadow Secretary of State for Social Security
Rt Hon. James Arbuthnot MP — Opposition Chief Whip
Oliver Eden, Lord Henley — Opposition Chief Whip in the House of Lords

Junior Shadow Ministers
Edward Garnier QC MP — Shadow Attorney General
Rt Hon Christopher Prout, Lord Kingsland QC — Shadow Lord Chancellor
Bernard Jenkin MP — Shadow Minister for Transport
Andrew Lansley CBE MP — Shadow Cabinet Office Minister

Changes from 2 February 2000
Sir George Young leaves the Shadow Cabinet
Oliver Letwin enters the Shadow Cabinet as Shadow Chief Secretary to the Treasury
Angela Browning moves from Shadow Secretary of State for Trade and Industry to Shadow Leader of the House of Commons, Shadow Chancellor of the Duchy of Lancaster and Constitutional Affairs spokesperson
David Heathcoat-Amory moves from Shadow Chief Secretary to the Treasury to Shadow Secretary of State for Trade and Industry

See also

Conservative Party (UK)-related lists
Official Opposition (United Kingdom)
Shadow Cabinet
Shadow Cabinet
1997 establishments in the United Kingdom
2001 disestablishments in the United Kingdom
British shadow cabinets
1997 in British politics